Shannon Thornton (born July 24, 1987) is an American actress. Her first television acting role was on Blue Bloods in 2010. She also had recurring roles on Rise, Dynasty, and Power. In 2020, she gained wider prominence as a lead cast member on the STARZ drama series P-Valley, on which she portrays Keyshawn, a stripper in an abusive relationship. She won a 2021 Gracie Allen Award for Actress in a Supporting Role - Drama for her performance. In 2022, she appeared in Future's music video "Love You Better."

Thornton was born and raised in Connecticut. She has modeled for Creme of Nature and other Black hair care products.

Awards and nominations

For P-Valley 
 2021 – Winner, Gracie Allen Award, Actress in a Supporting Role - Drama
 2022 – Winner, Women's Image Network Award for Best Actress, Drama Series (for "White Knight")

References

External links 
 Official Instagram
 

Living people
African-American actresses
21st-century African-American women
Actresses from Connecticut
1987 births